Katharine Kreiner-Phillips (born May 4, 1957) is a former World Cup alpine ski racer and Olympic gold medalist from Canada.

Career
She won the giant slalom at the 1976 Winter Olympics in Innsbruck, Austria. First out of the gate on Friday the 13th, Kreiner prevented double-gold medalist Rosi Mittermaier from sweeping the women's three alpine events, as Mittermaier won the silver medal. It was Canada's only gold medal in Innsbruck.

Born in Timmins, Ontario, Kreiner was an alpine racing prodigy in Canada, the youngest of six children of Margaret (Peggy) and Harold O. Kreiner (1920–1999), a Timmins physician and her coach until she made the national team. He was the team doctor for the Canadian alpine ski team for the 1966 World Championships in Portillo, Chile, and the Canadian Olympic team for the winter games in 1968 in Grenoble, France.

Kreiner made the national 'B' team at age 13 for a year, and was promoted to the 'A' team in the summer of 1971. She had her first World Cup top ten result in mid-January 1972, a sixth place in a downhill at Grindelwald, Switzerland. Three weeks later, Kreiner placed 14th in the slalom at the 1972 Winter Olympics in Sapporo, Japan.  She made her first World Cup podium in 1973 at Alyeska in Alaska in giant slalom, and gained her first and only World Cup victory at age 16 in 1974 at Pfronten, West Germany. Kreiner raced ten seasons on the World Cup circuit and finished with one victory, seven podiums, and 47 top tens. After her Olympic victory, she was named the Canadian Female Athlete of the Year in 1976.

From 1948 to 1980, the Winter Olympics also served as the World Championships for alpine skiing, making the Olympic champion the concurrent world champion. Kreiner was immediately inducted into the Canada's Sports Hall of Fame at age 18, and was also inducted into the Ontario Sports Hall of Fame in 2002.

Kreiner's Olympic win in 1976 surprised even her; she had shipped home most of her items from Innsbruck and had to borrow a uniform for the medal ceremony. Her older sister Laurie was also a World Cup racer and two-time Olympian; she had the 28th starting position (of 43) and had tears of joy for Kathy while still in the starting gate and finished 27th. Laurie had just missed an Olympic medal in 1972 with a fourth place in the giant slalom.

At the 1980 Winter Olympics at Lake Placid, Kreiner finished fifth in the downhill and ninth in the giant slalom, held at Whiteface Mountain. During her final season in 1981, Kreiner ascended her only World Cup podium in downhill, and raced independent of the Canadian national team. Her sixth and final podium in giant slalom came nearly four years earlier at Sun Valley in March 1977.

Kreiner married Dave Phillips, a former freestyle skier with the Canadian national team. As of 2020, she remains the only Olympic gold medallist from Timmins.

World Cup results

Season standings

Points were only awarded for top ten (through 1979) and top fifteen finishes (see scoring system).

Race podiums
 1 win – (1 GS)
 7 podiums – (6 GS, 1 DH); 47 top tens

World Championship results

From 1948 through 1980, the Winter Olympics were also the World Championships for alpine skiing.
At the World Championships from 1954 through 1980, the combined was a "paper race" using the results of the three events (DH, GS, SL).

Olympic results

Video

References

External links
 
 
 Kathy Kreiner at Canadian Ski Hall of Fame
 Timmins Ski Racers

Canadian female alpine skiers
Olympic gold medalists for Canada
Alpine skiers at the 1972 Winter Olympics
Alpine skiers at the 1976 Winter Olympics
Alpine skiers at the 1980 Winter Olympics
Olympic alpine skiers of Canada
Sportspeople from Timmins
1957 births
Living people
Olympic medalists in alpine skiing
Medalists at the 1976 Winter Olympics